The 2022 CAF Women's Champions League UNAF Qualifiers is the 2nd edition of the CAF Women's Champions League UNAF Qualifiers tournament organised by the UNAF for the women's clubs of association nations. This edition was held from 12 to 21 August 2022 in Agadir, Morocco. The winners of the tournament qualified for the 2022 CAF Women's Champions League final tournament to be held in Morocco. Wadi Degla was the champions.

Afak Relizane that was favorite finished third, seven of his players had covid-19 and don't taked part to the tournament.

Participating teams
The following three teams contested in the qualifying tournament. AS FAR from Morocco is the 2022 Moroccan League champions and therefore qualified automatically as the hosts of the final tournament.

Venues

Qualifying tournament

Statistics

Goalscorers

References

External links 
2022 CAF Women's Champions League UNAF Qualifiers - unafonline.org

2022 CAF Women's Champions League
Women's Champions League
CAF